Squirting flower may refer to:

 Practical joke device, smell my pretty "flower" (squirt!)
 "Specimen: Unknown", fictional fast-growing alien flowers squirting death
 Spathodea, flowers squirt when squeezed
 Squirting cucumber, although its flowers don't do the squirting